Clinton and Nadine (also known as Blood Money) is an American TV movie broadcast on HBO on May 28, 1988.

Plot 
Clinton (Andy Garcia) enlists the aid of Nadine (Ellen Barkin), an expensive call girl, to find his brother's murderer. Clinton and Nadine get sucked into a plot to smuggle guns to the Contra forces in Nicaragua.

Cast 
 Andy Garcia as Clinton Dillard
 Ellen Barkin as Nadine Powers
 Morgan Freeman as Dorsey Pratt
 John C. McGinley as Turner
 Michael Lombard as James Conrad
 Brad Sullivan as General John Anson
 Alan North as Detective Rayburn
 Bill Raymond as Jewell
 Mario Ernesto Sánchez as Rojas
 Nancy Giles as Alice
 Helen Davies as Ione
 Julio Oscar Mechoso as Huesito 
 Anthony Correa as Luis
 Jay Amor as Bernando
 Helen Hanft as Lady Manager
 Carlos Cestero as Chamorro
 Pedro De Pool as Adolfo

References

External links 
 

1988 television films
1988 films
1988 action films
1980s crime thriller films
1980s action drama films
Action television films
American crime thriller films
American television films
Crime television films
HBO Films films
American films about revenge
Films directed by Jerry Schatzberg
Films set in Costa Rica
1980s American films